"She's a Secretary" is a song by the German synthpop band Celebrate the Nun, released in 1990 as the third single from their 1989 debut album Meanwhile. The song peaked at No. 12 on the Billboard Dance Play Chart on the week of December 8, 1990.

Track listing
CD single (U.S., 1990)
 "She's a Secretary" (Gothic Mix) - 5:29
 "She's a Secretary" (Gothic Dub) - 3:39
 "She's a Secretary" (Nonne Mix) - 4:10
 "She's a Secretary" (Monja Mix) - 5:35
 "She's a Secretary" (Spastic Dub) - 6:04
 "Strange" - 5:10
 "Will You Be There" (12" Version) - 5:29

References

External links 
 She's a Secretary at Discogs
 

1989 songs
1990 singles
Celebrate the Nun songs
Songs written by H.P. Baxxter
Songs written by Rick J. Jordan
Enigma Records singles